Streptocephalus gracilis is a species of crustacean in family Streptocephalidae. It is endemic to South Africa.

References

Branchiopoda
Endemic crustaceans of South Africa
Freshwater crustaceans of Africa
Crustaceans described in 1898
Taxonomy articles created by Polbot